Inactive is a TRPV channel in invertebrates.  Inactive mutant flies show locomotor and hearing deficits.

References

Ion channels
Nervous system